The Other Side of Down is the third studio album by American singer David Archuleta. It was released on October 5, 2010, through Jive Records. It was his final album for Jive.

The album was promoted in Southeast Asia by Asian Tour, which began in July 2011.

Background
The album release date was first set to September 14, 2010, but it was later pushed to October 5, 2010. On that day, the album was released in the United States, under Jive Records in three editions: a standard CD only edition, a deluxe CD+DVD edition and a Fan Edition exclusive to David's official site. The Fan Edition includes not only the deluxe CD+DVD edition, but also a 4" by 6" picture window, four high quality photos of David himself in 2 double-sided 4" by 6" pictures, one picture hand-initialed by David, and an album-exclusive friendship bracelet – all packaged in a deluxe 7" by 7" memory box. Pre-orderers of the Fan Edition also received a free instant MP3 download of the album's lead single, "Something 'Bout Love" and instant enrollment into a contest draw for an HD Flip Video camera containing footage of David.

The deluxe version DVD contains four videos: the album photoshoot, a Q&A session, the music video for "Something 'Bout Love" and the making of the video.

The album released in Japan, on November 2010, featuring a bonus track: "Nothing Else Better to Do".

"The Other Side of Down" was re-released in a re-packaged version titled The Other Side of Down: Asian Tour Edition, while David was touring in Asia. This version of the album features four brand new tracks, plus the previous released song "Zero Gravity", and became available on July 19, 2011, exclusively on Asia. It also presents a new logo, a new photoshoot by Matt Clayton, and includes a lyric booklet, and a DVD containing karaoke versions of four David hits.

Singles
Only "Something 'Bout Love" was released as an official single from the album, and became available as a digital download. Other songs were released as radio singles with no official music videos. After the re-release of the album in Asia, under the name The Other Side of Down: Asian Tour Edition, Archuleta announced that he will release the track "Wait" as a single. An official music video for the song was filmed in Hong Kong in the beginning of November 2011 and premiered on Christmas Day, December 25, 2011).

 Something 'Bout Love was released as the album's lead single. The song could be previewed via Archuleta's Official Mobile Fan Club on June 28, 2010. On July 1, "Something 'Bout Love" started streaming exclusively on Archuleta's official website. The single was officially released via digital download on July 20, 2010. The music video, filmed on July 16, premiered on August 5, 2010, at VEVO.
 Elevator was announced in early September to be the album's second single. It was released to airplay on September 14, 2010. Archuleta stated that he wanted to make a music video for the song in October 2010, nevertheless video was shot for the song.
 Falling Stars was also released as a radio single on October 29, 2010 and it is the last single from the main edition of the album.
 Everything & More was released on a radio station in Singapore and it is a promotional single from the re-release of the album: The Other Side of Down: Asian Tour Edition.
 Wait is one of the bonus tracks from The Other Side of Down: Asian Tour Edition. Archuleta announced on a video-blog in October 2011 that he was going to shoot a music video for the song. The music video was shot in Hong Kong on November 2, 2011, and premiered on Channel V on Christmas Day (December 25, 2011). It was made available on YouTube by Channel V on December 29, one day after Archuleta's 21st birthday.

Reception

Commercial performance
The album sold 24,000 copies in its first week of its release, debuting at number thirteen on the US Billboard 200 and had sold a total of 63,000 copies as of January 7, 2011. In Canada, the album peaked at number 68 on the Canadian Albums Chart.

Critical reception

The critical reception for The Other Side of Down has been generally positive. Entertainment Weekly gave the album a B, praising Stomping the Roses and Elevator and stating that "[Archuleta's] vocals gleam with dewy naïveté". Newsweek praised Archuleta for "finally acting his age" and especially liked the "playful bits" such as Something 'Bout Love, Elevator, and Parachutes & Airplanes. Several Idol-related blogs also had high praises for the album such as Idol Wild which called it an "extremely strong, albeit safe album" and stated they were "blown away by how much David appears to have matured both emotionally and musically on this disc". Stephen Thomas Erlewine of allmusic gave the album mixed reviews, stating "Archuleta certainly is a follower, not an innovator, but he's sharp enough to hire collaborators to coax comfortable commercial pop out of him -- something that is much more difficult than it appears." He gave the album 3 stars out of 5.

Track listing
'''

Charts

=References

2012 albums
19 Recordings albums 
Albums produced by Emanuel Kiriakou
Albums produced by S*A*M and Sluggo
Albums produced by Matt Squire
David Archuleta albums
Jive Records albums